"24" is a song by American rapper Money Man. It was released on February 21, 2020 as a single from his eighteenth mixtape, Epidemic. A remix version featuring Lil Baby was released on August 14, 2020. Both versions and the song's title itself serve as tributes to basketball player Kobe Bryant, who died in a helicopter crash in January 2020.

Composition
The bass-heavy track starts off with Money Man paying his respect to Kobe Bryant. He further "flexes his status as an independent artist", accentuating his "lavish" lifestyle, including the diamonds on his chains and the expensive cars he rides around. Aron A. of HotNewHipHop gave the song a HOTTTTT rating and said: "The rapper's hustler's mentality informs each bar he spits. It could be a light flex or a moment of introspection but Money Man drops jewels and gems throughout his music".

Remix

The official "24" remix with Lil Baby was released on August 14, 2020 and included on the deluxe edition of Money Man's Epidemic, released a week later.

Composition

As with the original, the duo pay homage to Kobe Bryant over a "tantalizing", "muddy" bass and a "twangy" guitar loop. They also make references footballer Joe Flacco and rapper Pop Smoke.

Critical reception
Rolling Stones Charles Holmes praised the rappers for having "the flow of the year", and stated "their total disregard for decorum in favor of showing off one's preternatural lyrical abilities is weirdly the most fitting tribute one could give to Bryant". HotNewHipHops Aron A. said "It's a glorious occasion when two certified hustlers team up on wax", appraising the collaboration: "Money Man's deep rich vocals glide on the production with gems from the mind of a hustler before Lil Baby comes through to keep his hot streak going in 2020 with yet another show-stealing verse".

Cover art
The cover art features black mamba snakes in the form of basketballs with the number 24 on one of the snakes. "Black Mamba" was Kobe Bryant's nickname and the "24" is the number he wore during his Hall of Fame career with the Los Angeles Lakers.

Charts

Weekly charts

Year-end charts

Certifications

References

2020 songs
2020 singles
Empire Distribution singles
Lil Baby songs
Kobe Bryant
Songs about basketball players
Commemoration songs
Songs written by Lil Baby